Armenian General Benevolent Union Ararat Nicosia Futsal Club is a futsal club based in Nicosia, Cyprus.

Honours

National
Cypriot First Division (7): 2001, 2002, 2003, 2004, 2005, 2007, 2010
Cypriot Cup (6): 2000, 2003, 2005, 2008, 2009, 2010

See also
Armenian General Benevolent Union

Externan links
Official Website

Futsal clubs in Cyprus
Armenian General Benevolent Union
Diaspora sports clubs
Sport in Nicosia
Futsal clubs established in 1999
1999 establishments in Cyprus